Charles Smart Evans (1778 – 4 January 1849) was an English vocalist and composer.

Evans was a chorister under Dr. Edmund Ayrton, and in 1808 a gentleman of the Chapel Royal. His name appears among the alto singers in the chorus of the "Ancient Concerts" of 1798, and he took part with John Braham and others in the music performed at Weber's funeral in 1826.

Four of Evans's part-songs gained prizes from the Glee and Catch Clubs, namely: Beauties, have you seen a toy? (1811); Fill all the glasses (1812); Ode to the Memory of Samuel Webbe (1817), for Samuel Webbe; and Great Bacchus (1821). Subsequently he became a catholic and a member of the choir of the chapel of the Portuguese embassy. Evans wrote a Magnificat and some motets, contained in books iv. and v. of Alfred Novello's "Collection of Motets". He was also the composer of many songs.

References

1778 births
1849 deaths
19th-century British male singers
English composers
18th-century English singers
18th-century composers
18th-century male musicians
18th-century musicians
19th-century British composers
Gentlemen of the Chapel Royal